Jesus Kherkatary is an actor, director and playback singer. He is famous for his work in Shedin Dekha Hoyechilo.

Filmography

As an actor
 Fashini dwoleng (2007)
 Jom rajani birthday (2010)
 Mr. Bodoland (2012)
 Angni bikha (2013)
 Khither (2013)
 Nerswn (2014)
 Ada khoro gidir (2015)
 Jiuni lamayao (2015)
 Khwina (2016)
 Daya angni nonga (2016)
 Ang boro (2017)
 Lantha police (2017)
 Phaglee (2018)
 I love you (2018)
 Helina (2018 music video)
Jengshi (2019)

As a television actor
 Dhou Jibonor (2015)
 Miss Junali LLB (2015)

Plays
 Fakhon (2013)
 Ghost residency (2014)
 Baduli (2014)
 Bhumora (2014)
 Kathputola (2015)
 Who are we (2015)

As a director
 Fwrmaiso haywi (2014)
 Onnai gwiyi udkhari (2015)
 Mwihur (2019)

As an assistant director
 Angni bikha (2013)
 Nerswn (2014)
 Ada khoro gidir (2015)
 Khwina (2016)

See also
 Bodo films

References

Bodo people
Living people
Year of birth missing (living people)